William Wigan Harvey (17 January 1810 – 7 May 1883) was an English cleric and academic. Born at Great Stanmore, he was educated at Eton College and King's College, Cambridge. He became a Fellow of King's in 1831, and a Fellow of the Society of Antiquaries of London. Later he was rector of Buckland, and then of Ewelme, a controversial appointment that brought criticism on William Gladstone. He died at Ewelme.

Harvey was also a cricketer with amateur status, active in 1831. He made his first-class debut in 1831 and appeared in one match, playing for Cambridge University. He scored nine runs with a highest score of 5 and took no wickets.

References

1810 births
1883 deaths
People educated at Eton College
Alumni of King's College, Cambridge
19th-century English Anglican priests
Fellows of King's College, Cambridge
Fellows of the Society of Antiquaries of London
English cricketers
English cricketers of 1826 to 1863
Cambridge University cricketers
People from Stanmore
People from South Oxfordshire District